Cindy Phenix (born 1989 in Montreal, Quebec) is a Canadian painter living and working in Los Angeles, California. Phenix has exhibited internationally at venues including Nino Mier Gallery in Los Angeles and Brussels, 6018 North in Chicago, Galerie Hugues Charboneau in Montreal, Maison de la culture in Longueuil, and others.

Biography 
Phenix grew up in Montreal, Quebec. Phenix completed her BFA at Concordia University in Montreal in 2016. She earned an MFA at Northwestern University in Evanston, IL in 2020.  Phenix's works are included in the collections of the Musée national des beaux-arts du Québec.

Residencies and awards 
 Banff Centre for Arts and Creativity Artist in Residence, 2017
 Master Research Fellowship Recipient, Fonds de recherche du Québec - Société et culture, 2018-2020
 RBC Canadian Painting Competition Finalist, 2015

References

External links 
 

1989 births
Living people
Artists from Montreal
Concordia University alumni
Northwestern University alumni
21st-century Canadian painters
21st-century Canadian women artists
Canadian painters
Canadian contemporary artists
Canadian women artists